The River Leven is a river in Fife, Scotland. It flows from Loch Leven into the Firth of Forth at the town of Leven. The river is home to brown trout and hosts a run of sea trout and atlantic salmon. The estuary has bass and mullet.

In previous centuries its water was used to power linen mills on its banks, particularly near Markinch, as well as three paper mills: Smith Anderson in Leslie, and Tullis Russell and John Dixon of Markinch.

External links
Scottish gazetteer on the river
 "Forth District Salmon Fishery Board"
 "River Forth Fisheries Trust"
 "River Leven Angling Club"

Levenmouth
Rivers of Fife
0Leven